The Europe Zone was one of the three regional zones of the 1958 Davis Cup.

24 teams entered the Europe Zone, with the winner going on to compete in the Inter-Zonal Zone against the winners of the America Zone and Eastern Zone. Italy defeated Great Britain in the final and progressed to the Inter-Zonal Zone.

Draw

First round

Monaco vs. India

Yugoslavia vs. Czechoslovakia

Luxembourg vs. Finland

Switzerland vs. Austria

Turkey vs. Chile

Egypt vs. Spain

Hungary vs. Brazil

West Germany vs. Netherlands

Second round

Italy vs. India

Denmark vs. Czechoslovakia

Finland vs. Mexico

Switzerland vs. Poland

France vs. Chile

Spain vs. Sweden

Great Britain vs. Brazil

West Germany vs. Belgium

Quarterfinals

Denmark vs. Italy

Poland vs. Mexico

France vs. Sweden

Great Britain vs. West Germany

Semifinals

Poland vs. Italy

Great Britain vs. France

Final

Italy vs. Great Britain

References

External links
Davis Cup official website

Davis Cup Europe/Africa Zone
Europe Zone
Davis Cup